The Church of San Pedro el Real (St Peter the Royal), also known as San Pedro el Viejo is a small medieval church in central Madrid, Spain.

The initial structure was built in the 14th century, but extensive renovations were performed, and a new facade and portals added in the 17th and 19th centuries. It may have begun as Benedictine monastery, although the Bell-tower has Mudéjar qualities, and resembles a minaret; however, present tower seems to have been worked on in the 14th century when Madrid was firmly in Castilian hands. It was originally built by King Alfonso XI to celebrate his victory in the Battle of Algeciras in 1344.

The church contains the tombs of Kings Alfonso I of Asturias and Ramiro II of León. San Pedro also contains the  statue of Jesus known as Jesús el Pobre, or Jesus the Poor, sculpted by Juan Astorga in the late eighteenth century.

The church is located at Calle Nuncio, 14, near the Plaza Mayor.

See also
 Catholic Church in Spain
 List of oldest church buildings
 Romanesque churches in Madrid

References

External links

Brief description

Romanesque architecture in Madrid
Pedro Real
Bien de Interés Cultural landmarks in Madrid
Buildings and structures in Palacio neighborhood, Madrid